Kogho is a town in the Kogho Department of Ganzourgou Province in central Burkina Faso. Kogho is the capital of Kogho Department, and has a population of 3780.

References

External links
Satellite map at Maplandia.com

Populated places in the Plateau-Central Region
Ganzourgou Province